Metexilisia is a monotypic moth genus in the subfamily Arctiinae. Its single species, Metexilisia citrago, is found in Madagascar. Both the genus and species were first described by Hervé de Toulgoët in 1958.

References

Lithosiini
Monotypic moth genera